Kotoinazuma Yoshihiro  (born 26 April 1962 as Masahiro Tamura) is a former sumo wrestler from Niiharu, Gunma, Japan. He made his professional debut in 1978, and reached the top division in 1987. His highest rank was komusubi and he earned two special prizes. After retirement he became an elder in the Japan Sumo Association and as of 2016 he is a coach at Sadogatake stable under the name Kumegawa.

Career
He was recruited by the former yokozuna Kotozakura of the Sadogatake stable. For his first appearance on the banzuke ranking sheets he was given the shikona of Kotoinazuma, with the prefix of Koto, the Japanese stringed instrument, used by all members of his stable, and the suffix "Inazuma" meaning "lightning."

Kotoinazuma was a late-blooming wrestler. It took him over nine years from his professional debut in March 1978 to reach the top makuuchi division, in November 1987. He was one of the few wrestlers to reach the top division despite twice going 0–7 in the lower divisions. (He also shares with yokozuna Kitanoumi the odd distinction of following an undefeated 7–0 score with a 0–7.) In addition it took Kotoinazuma 100 career tournaments before he earned a special prize (an Outstanding Performance Award in September 1994), which is the most in sumo history. He is also the second slowest to make it to a sanyaku rank, at 106 tournaments from sumo entry. This occurred when he was promoted to the rank of komusubi for the November 1995 tournament. This was to be his only tournament in sanyaku, as he had a losing record of six wins against nine losses. However, he did have his first and only win over a yokozuna  in this tournament, defeating Takanohana. (He never upset a yokozuna at a maegashira rank and so did not receive any gold stars). He fought his final tournament in makuuchi in September 1998, by which time he was the oldest man in the top division. He competed in 60 top division tournaments without ever achieving double-digit wins, which is a record. He announced his retirement in July 1999 after facing certain demotion to the unsalaried makushita division. He had been an active wrestler for 21 years and fought 1551 bouts across 129 tournaments.

Retirement from sumo
Kotoinazuma became an elder of the Japan Sumo Association under the name Kumegawa Oyakata. He works as a coach at Sadogatake stable, and as a judge of tournament bouts.

Fighting style
Although he was fairly adept at pushing and thrusting techniques, he favoured yotsu-sumo or grappling techniques. His preferred grip on his opponent's mawashi was migi-yotsu, a left hand outside, right hand inside position. He would regularly use his left hand outer grip to win by uwate-nage or overarm throw, although his most common winning kimarite was yori-kiri, a straightforward force out. He also had the slap down, scoop throw and outer leg trip in his repertoire.

Personal life
Kotoinazuma's interests include music and golf.

He received treatment for gout and a side-effect of the therapeutic agent was hair loss. This meant that the tokoyama or hairdressers had difficulty in producing the elaborate ginkgo leaf style oichomage or topknot that professional sumo wrestlers are required to wear on the dohyō. He had a physical resemblance to another top division wrestler of the time, Sasshūnada, who also had a receding hair-line.

Career record

See also
Glossary of sumo terms
List of past sumo wrestlers
List of sumo elders
List of komusubi

References

External links

1962 births
Japanese sumo wrestlers
Living people
Sumo people from Gunma Prefecture
Komusubi
Sadogatake stable sumo wrestlers